Johann "Hans" Riederer (born 30 December 1957) is a German sports shooter and Olympic medalist. He won bronze medal in the 10 metre air rifle at the 1988 Summer Olympics in Seoul, and at the 1992 Summer Olympics in Barcelona. Riederer was born in Unterföhring, Bavaria.

References

1957 births
Living people
German male sport shooters
Shooters at the 1988 Summer Olympics
Shooters at the 1992 Summer Olympics
Olympic shooters of Germany
Olympic bronze medalists for Germany
Olympic medalists in shooting

Medalists at the 1992 Summer Olympics
Sportspeople from Upper Bavaria
People from Munich (district)
20th-century German people